Kang Jung-hun (born 16 December 1987) is a South Korean footballer who plays as a forward for Busan Transportation Corporation on loan from FC Seoul in the K League Classic.

Club career 
Kang was FC Seoul's first choice from the 2010 draft intake, and made his professional debut on 25 April 2010 in Seoul's away league match against Gyeongnam FC. Aside from a few League Cup matches, Kang was unused for the remainder of the 2010 season. Kang continued with FC Seoul into the 2011 K-League season, and scored his first professional goal against Jeonbuk Hyundai Motors.

Club career statistics

References

External links 

1987 births
Living people
Association football forwards
South Korean footballers
FC Seoul players
Gangwon FC players
K League 1 players
Konkuk University alumni